The Podlasie Tour is a stage cycling race held in the Podlachia Region, Poland. It was first held in 2015 and is part of the UCI Europe Tour in category 2.2.

Winners

References

External links

Cycle races in Poland
2015 establishments in Poland
Recurring sporting events established in 2015
UCI Europe Tour races